Charge-depleting or EV mode refers to a mode of vehicle operation that is dependent on the 
energy from the battery pack. Battery electric vehicles operate solely in this mode. Most plug-in hybrids operate in charge-depleting mode at startup, and switch to charge-sustaining mode after the battery has reached its minimum state of charge (SOC) threshold, exhausting the vehicle's all-electric range (AER). Although there is no technically mandated minimum all-electric range, future state and/or federal legislation may address this for policy purposes.

Another charge-depleting strategy is called blended mode, in which the engine supplements the battery during medium to heavy loads. Although this strategy does not include a purely all-electric mode, early NREL (National Renewable Energy Laboratory) simulations indicate that similar fuel savings as compared to conventional plug-in hybrid battery discharge and charge strategies.  One advantage of a blended mode is that it may afford the vehicle designer the opportunity to use a smaller and less costly battery pack and traction motor.

References

External links
 Battery Lifetime Analysis and Simulation Tools Suite, National Renewable Energy Laboratory
 Enova Hybrid Drive Installed in First Production Hybrid School Buses
 AQMD Plug-in Hybrid Vehicle Technical Forum: Li-Ion Technically Ready, Manufacturing a Big Barrier
 Enova Offering its Hybrid Drive Systems for OEM or Retrofit Applications with Plug-In Option
 Plug-ins Progress
 Enova Systems Confirms Recent Awards Will Utilize Its Unique
 Mechanical Configurations of Hybrid Electric Vehicles
 Charge Sustaining and Charge Non-Sustaining Hybrids

Automotive technologies